Vinicia is a genus of flowering plants belonging to the family Asteraceae.

Its native range is Southeastern Brazil.

Species:
 Vinicia tomentosa Dematt.

References

Asteraceae
Asteraceae genera